Kenya short-toed lark may refer to:

 Athi short-toed lark, a species of lark found in eastern Africa
 Damara pink-billed lark, a subspecies of lark found in southern Africa